The Campus of The Citadel consists of a  space adjacent to Hampton Park in Charleston, South Carolina. It has been home to The Citadel since 1922 when the school moved from its location on Marion Square, including the Old Citadel. Arranged with the primary buildings surrounding a central  parade ground, it consists of barracks for the Corps of Cadets, academic buildings, a mess hall, chapel, library, athletic and recreational facilities, support buildings, and housing for faculty and staff.

The campus is built in a Spanish Moorish style.

The campus is bounded on the west by the Ashley River, to the north by the Wagener Terrace neighborhood, to the east by Hampton Park and the Hampton Park Terrace neighborhood, and to the South by the Westside Neighborhood.

Just off the main campus are the football stadium, baseball stadium, and alumni center. Additionally, the school owns and operates a large house facility located near the north end of the Isle of Palms.

Academic buildings

Athletic and recreational buildings

Administrative buildings

Barracks

Each of The Citadel's five barracks is built around a central quadrangle of red and white checkerboard style squares.  Rooms are arranged along the outer walls with a covered walkway known as the gallery separating rooms from the quadrangle. Of the original four barracks built between 1922 and 1942, only Stevens Barracks has not been demolished and completely rebuilt though it has seen significant renovation.  Watts Barracks was constructed in 1996 on the site of the old mess hall.  Watts Barracks housed First Battalion while Murray Barracks was under construction before Fourth Battalion occupied Watts Barracks.  During the demolition and reconstruction of Padgett-Thomas Barracks from 2000 through 2004, The Regimental Band and Pipes was housed in a temporary structure built behind Stevens Barracks and across Lee Avenue from Watts Barracks.  Second and Third Battalions occupied Stevens Barracks during the demolition and reconstruction of Padgett-Thomas Barracks and Law Barracks, respectively.

Other buildings

Monuments and memorials

References

 
Citadel